Keijo Korhonen (born  in Leppävirta) is a Finnish former ski jumper who competed from 1979 to 1983. He won a bronze medal in the team large hill at the 1982 FIS Nordic World Ski Championships in Oslo.

Korhonen's best individual finish was 4th in the large hill at Oberstdorf in 1979.

References

1956 births
Living people
People from Leppävirta
Finnish male ski jumpers
FIS Nordic World Ski Championships medalists in ski jumping
Sportspeople from North Savo
20th-century Finnish people